Lorran David Ferreira Costa (born 2 May 1995), simply known as Lorran, is a Brazilian footballer who plays as a forward for Votuporanguense.

Club career
Born in Cuiabá, Mato Grosso, Lorran represented Guarani as a youth. He made his senior debut on 12 April 2014, starting in a 3–2 Campeonato Paulista Série A2 home loss against Rio Branco-SP.

Lorran was promoted to the main squad for the 2016 season, and scored his first senior goal on 5 February in a 3–1 away defeat of Marília. On 20 April of that year, after being demoted to backup option, he was loaned to Série D side Caxias until the end of the year.

Upon returning, Lorran featured regularly during the Paulistão Série A2, but failed to appear in the Série B. On 3 October 2017, he signed a three-year deal with Santos and was assigned to the B-team.

On 24 January 2019, Lorran joined Caldense on loan. On 8 November, he moved to Brasiliense, also in a temporary deal, for the ensuing campaign.

On 1 June 2020, Lorran left Santos as his contract expired, without making a single appearance for the first team.

Career statistics

Honours
Caxias
Campeonato Gaúcho Série A2: 2016
Copa Serrana: 2016

References

External links
Jogos do Guarani profile 

1995 births
Living people
People from Cuiabá
Brazilian footballers
Association football forwards
Campeonato Brasileiro Série D players
Guarani FC players
Sociedade Esportiva e Recreativa Caxias do Sul players
Santos FC players
Associação Atlética Caldense players
Brasiliense Futebol Clube players
Bangu Atlético Clube players
Clube Atlético Votuporanguense players
Sportspeople from Mato Grosso